Adnan Raees (born 10 March 1981) is a Pakistani first-class cricketer who plays for Abbottabad cricket team.

References

External links
 

1981 births
Living people
Pakistani cricketers
Abbottabad cricketers
Water and Power Development Authority cricketers
Cricketers from Mardan
Peshawar cricketers
Khyber Pakhtunkhwa cricketers